Muerte suspendida is a 2015 Venezuelan action film directed by Óscar Rivas Gamboa.

Plot 
Bernardino Correia, a Portuguese owner of several service stations, is kidnapped by three individuals who are sent by Orozco, an ambitious and ruthless Colombian boss.

Production 
Criminal investigator Óscar Pérez approached director Óscar Rivas about creating a movie to improve values among those in Venezuela's law enforcement agencies. Pérez stated that he accepted the role because he believed in justice for Venezuela and that he wanted "people to fall in love with police work in Venezuela and to feel proud".

Reception 
In 2015, Muerte suspendida was released to the public, with Pérez serving as a protagonist, CICPC agent Efraín Robles, while also co-producing the film with information and equipment provided by CICPC. After Muerte suspendida became Venezuela's second-highest-grossing movie in 2015, a second movie was going to be created, though there were not enough resources in the country.

References

External links 

 

2015 films
2015 action films
Venezuelan action films
2010s Spanish-language films